The 2017 Munster Senior Hurling League, known for sponsorship reasons as the Co-Op Superstores.ie Munster Hurling League, was the second Munster Senior Hurling League, the annual hurling league competition for county teams from the province of Munster.

Clare came into the season as the defending champions. For the second year in succession Tipperary declined to field a team in the league. The opening round of the league took place on 8 January 2017.

On 29 January 2017, Cork won the league title following a 1-21 to 1-20 defeat of Limerick. It was their first Munster League title.

Format

Five of the six Munster teams compete in the league, with Tipperary opting not to participate.

Each team plays each other team once, earning 2 points for a win and 1 for a draw. The top two teams play each other in the final.

Table
{| class="wikitable" 
!width=20|
!width=150 style="text-align:left;"|Team
!width=20|
!width=20|
!width=20|
!width=20|
!width=30|
!width=50|
!width=20|
!width=20|
|- style="background:#D0F0C0;"
|1||align=left| Cork ||4||4||0||0||8-94||2-71||+41||8
|- style="background:#D0F0C0;"
|2||align=left| Limerick ||4||3||0||1||7-86||8-71||+12||6
|- 
|3||align=left| Clare ||4||2||0||2||4-77||6-62||+9||4
|-
|4||align=left| Waterford ||4||1||0||3||9-67||2-83||+5||2
|-
|5||align=left| Kerry ||4||0||0||4||1-64||11-101||−67||0
|}

Round 1

Round 2

Round 3

Round 4

Round 5

Final

Scoring statistics

Top scorers overall

Top scorers in a single game

Goalkeeping clean sheets

References

Munster Senior Hurling League
Munster Senior Hurling League